Lee Jung-hee (born 1969) is a South Korean female lawyer, politician, and human rights activist.

Lee Jung-hee may also refer to: 
Ri Jong-hui (rower) (born 1953), North Korean male rower
Lee Jeonghee (born 1963), South Korean female abacus master
Lee Jeong-hui (born 1965), South Korean female gymnast
Ri Jong-hui (born 1975), North Korean female footballer
Lee Jung (born Lee Jung-hee, 1981), South Korean male singer and actor